Red Orb Entertainment was a publishing division created by the Broderbund software company to market its video game titles, distinguishing them from its library of edutainment titles, which it marketed to schools. Launched on May 21, 1997, and based in Novato, California, the name comes from the first six letters of "Broderbund," which spell "Red Orb" when reversed.

After its parent company Broderbund was acquired by The Learning Company in 1998, Red Orb's brand continued to be used and was supported by the latter's Mindscape division. After TLC's parent company Mattel Interactive was sold off in 2000, Subsequent games of the Myst, Prince of Persia, and Warlords franchises were later published by Ubisoft, who acquired all of Mattel Interactive's entertainment library in March 2001.

Titles
Red Orb Entertainment developed and/or published several games in the late 1990s, including:

 John Saul's Blackstone Chronicles
 The Journeyman Project 3: Legacy of Time
 The Journeyman Project Trilogy
 Myst: Masterpiece Edition
 Prince of Persia 3D
 Ring: The Legend of the Nibelungen
 Riven: The Sequel to Myst
 Soul Fighter
 Take No Prisoners
 WarBreeds
 Warlords III: Darklords Rising
 Warlords III: Reign of Heroes

References

External links

Red Orb Entertainment at MobyGames

Video game publishers
Video game companies established in 1997
Video game companies disestablished in 2001
Defunct video game companies of the United States